George Lee Haskins (February 13, 1915 – October 4, 1991) was an American legal scholar and the Algernon Sydney Biddle Professor of Law at the University of Pennsylvania Law School.

Biography

Haskins was the son of medievalist Charles Homer Haskins, Dean of the College of Arts and Sciences at Harvard University.  He was born and grew up in Cambridge, Massachusetts.

He was a graduate of Phillips Exeter Academy (1931), Harvard University (AB, summa cum laude, 1935), and Harvard Law School (Juris Doctor, 1942). Haskins was a Guggenheim Fellow, and was a Henry Fellow at Merton College of Oxford University.  He enlisted during World War 2, and rose to become a major in military intelligence in the War Department General Staff, receiving the Army Commendation Medal with oak leaf clusters and—from the British government—the George Medal.

Haskins was the Algernon Sydney Biddle Professor of Law at the University of Pennsylvania Law School, the oldest of the endowed chairs at the law school. He taught at the law school for 39 years.

He wrote at least ten books and 82 articles. Haskins was a Fellow of the Royal Historical Society, and President of the American Society for Legal History. He died on October 4, 1991, at his home in Hancock, Maine.

References 

1915 births
1991 deaths
Phillips Exeter Academy alumni
Harvard Law School alumni
American legal scholars
University of Pennsylvania Law School faculty
People from Cambridge, Massachusetts
United States Department of War officials
Alumni of Merton College, Oxford
People from Hancock, Maine
Maine lawyers
Fellows of the Royal Historical Society
20th-century American lawyers